Daud Shah is a village in Khyber Province, Pakistan.

Daud Shah may also refer to:

Daud Shah (actor)
 Daud Shah (Paktika), a delegate to Afghanistan's Constitutional Loya Jirga

See also